This is a list of schools in Hertfordshire, England.

State-funded schools

Primary schools

The Abbey CE Primary School, St Albans
Abbots Langley School, Abbots Langley
Abel Smith School, Hertford
Aboyne Lodge JMI School, St Albans
Alban City School, St Albans
Alban Wood Primary School, Watford
Albury CE Primary School, Albury
Aldbury CE Primary School, Aldbury
All Saints CE Primary School, Datchworth
All Saints CE Primary School, Bishop's Stortford
Almond Hill Junior School, Stevenage
Andrews Lane Primary School, Cheshunt
Anstey First School, Anstey
Applecroft School, Welwyn Garden City
Ardeley St Lawrence CE Primary School, Ardeley
Arnett Hills JMI School, Rickmansworth
Ascot Road Community Free School, Watford
Ashfield Junior School, Bushey
Ashtree Primary School, Stevenage
Ashwell Primary School, Ashwell
Aston St Mary's CE Primary School, Aston
Avanti Meadows Primary School, Bishop's Stortford
Aycliffe Drive Primary School, Hemel Hempstead
Barkway CE First School, Barkway
Barley CE First School, Barley
Bayford CE Primary School, Bayford
Bedmond Academy, Bedmond
Bedwell Primary School, Bedwell
Beech Hyde Primary School, Wheathampstead
Beechfield School, Watford
Belswains Primary School, Hemel Hempstead
Bengeo Primary School, Hertford
Benington CE Primary School, Benington
Bernards Heath Infant School, Bernards Heath
Bernards Heath Junior School, Bernards Heath
Birchwood Avenue Primary School, Hatfield
Bishop Wood CE Junior School, Tring
Bonneygrove Primary School, Cheshunt
Bournehall Primary School, Bushey
Bovingdon Primary Academy, Bovingdon
Bowmansgreen Primary School, London Colney
Boxmoor Primary School, Hemel Hempstead
Breachwood Green JMI School, Breachwood Green
Bridgewater Primary School, Berkhamsted
Broadfield Academy, Hemel Hempstead
Brockswood Primary and Nursery School, Hemel Hempstead
Bromet Primary School, Watford
Brookland Infant School, Cheshunt
Brookland Junior School, Cheshunt
Brookmans Park School, Brookmans Park
Broom Barns Primary School, Stevenage
Broxbourne CE Primary School, Broxbourne
Burleigh Primary School, Cheshunt
Bushey and Oxhey Infant School, Bushey
Bushey Heath Primary School,  Bushey
Bushey Manor Junior School, Bushey
Camp Primary School, St. Albans
Camps Hill Primary School, Stevenage
Cassiobury Infant School, Watford
Cassiobury Junior School, Watford
Central Primary School, Watford
Chambersbury Primary School, Hemel Hempstead
Chater Infant School, Watford
Chater Junior School, Watford
Chaulden Infants' School, Hemel Hempstead
Chaulden Junior School, Hemel Hempstead
Cherry Tree Primary School, Watford
Chorleywood Primary School, Chorleywood
Christ Church CE Primary School, Ware
Christ Church Chorleywood CE School, Chorleywood
Churchfield CE Academy, Cheshunt
Clore Shalom School, Shenley
Coates Way JMI School, Watford
Cockernhoe Endowed CE Primary School, Cockernhoe
Codicote CE Primary School, Codicote
Colney Heath JMI School, Colney Heath
Commonswood Primary School, Welwyn Garden City
Countess Anne CE School, Hatfield
Cowley Hill School, Borehamwood
Crabtree Infants' School, Harpenden
Crabtree Junior School, Harpenden
Cranborne Primary School, Potters Bar
The Cranbourne Primary School, Hoddesdon
Creswick Primary School, Welwyn Garden City
Cuffley School, Cuffley
Cunningham Hill Infant School, St. Albans
Cunningham Hill Junior School, St. Albans
De Havilland Primary School, Hatfield
Dewhurst St Mary CE Primary School, Cheshunt
Divine Saviour RC Primary School, Abbotts Langley
Downfield Primary School, Cheshunt
Dundale Primary School, Tring
Eastbury Farm Primary School, Northwood
Essendon CE Primary School, Essendon
Fair Field Junior School, Radlett
Fairfields Primary School, Cheshunt
Fairlands Primary School, Stevenage
Fawbert and Barnard Infants' School, Sawbridgeworth
Featherstone Wood Primary School, Stevenage
Field Junior School, Watford
Flamstead End School, Cheshunt
Flamstead Village School, Flamstead
Fleetville Infant School, Fleetville
Fleetville Junior School, Fleetville
Forres Primary School, Hoddesdon
Four Swannes Primary School, Waltham Cross
Furneux Pelham CE School, Buntingford
Gaddesden Row JMI School, Hemel Hempstead
Gade Valley Primary School, Hemel Hempstead
Galley Hill Primary School and Nursery, Hemel Hempstead
Garden City Academy, Letchworth Garden City
Garden Fields JMI School, St. Albans
George Street Primary School, Hemel Hempstead
Giles Junior School, Stevenage
The Giles Infants School, Stevenage
Goffs Oak Primary School, Goffs Oak
Goldfield Infants' School, Tring
The Grange Academy, Letchworth
Graveley Primary School, Graveley
Great Gaddesden CE Primary School, Great Gaddesden
Green Lanes Primary School, Hatfield
Greenfields Primary School, Watford
Greenway Primary School, Berkhamsted
The Greneway School, Royston
The Grove Academy, Watford
The Grove Infant School, Harpenden
The Grove Junior School, Harpenden
Grove Road Primary School, Tring
Hammond Academy, Hemel Hempstead
Harpenden Academy, Harpenden
Hartsbourne Primary School, Bushey Heath
Hartsfield JMI School, Baldock
Harvey Road Primary School, Croxley Green
Harwood Hill JMI School, Welwyn Garden City
Hatfield Community Free School, Hatfield
Hertford Heath Primary School, Hertford Heath
Hertford St Andrews CE Primary School, Hertford
Hertingfordbury Cowper CE Primary School, Hertford
Hertsmere Jewish Primary School, Radlett
Hexton JMI School, Hitchin
High Beeches Primary School, Harpenden
High Wych CE Primary School, High Wych
Highbury Infant School, Hitchin
Highover JMI School, Hitchin
Highwood Primary School, Bushey
Hillmead Primary School, Bishop's Stortford
Hillshott Infant School, Letchworth Garden City
Hobbs Hill Wood Primary School, Hemel Hempstead
Hobletts Manor Infants' School, Hemel Hempstead
Hobletts Manor Junior School, Hemel Hempstead
Holdbrook Primary School, Waltham Cross
Hollybush Primary School, Hertford
Holtsmere End Infant School, Hemel Hempstead
Holtsmere End Junior School, Hemel Hempstead
Holwell Primary School, Welwyn Garden City
The Holy Family RC Primary School, Welwyn Garden City
Holy Rood RC Primary School, Watford
Holy Trinity CE Primary School, Cheshunt
Holywell Primary School, Watford
Homerswood Primary School, Welwyn Garden City
Hormead CE First School, Buntingford
How Wood Primary School, Park Street
Howe Dell Primary School, Hatfield
Hunsdon JMI School, Hunsdon
Hurst Drive Primary School, Waltham Cross
Ickleford Primary School, Ickleford
Icknield Infant School, Letchworth Garden City
Icknield Walk First School, Royston
Jenyns First School, Braughing
Jupiter Community Free School, Hemel Hempstead
Kenilworth Primary School, Borehamwood
Killigrew Primary School, St. Albans
Kimpton Primary School, Kimpton
King James Academy Royston
Kings Langley Primary School, Kings Langley
Kingshill Infant School, Ware
Kingsway Infant School, Watford
Kingsway Junior School, Watford
Knebworth Primary School, Knebworth
Knutsford Primary Academy, Watford
Ladbrooke JMI School, Potters Bar
Lanchester Community Free School, Watford
Larkspur Academy, Ware
Laurance Haines School, Watford
Layston CE First School, Buntingford
The Lea Primary School, Harpenden
Leavesden JMI School, Leavesden
Letchmore Infants' School, Stevenage
Leverstock Green CE Primary School, Hemel Hempstead
The Leys Primary School, Stevenage
Lime Walk Primary School, Hemel Hempstead
Little Gaddesden CE Primary School, Little Gaddesden
Little Green Junior School, Croxley Green
Little Hadham Primary School, Little Hadham
Little Heath Primary School, Potters Bar
Little Munden Primary School, Ware
Little Reddings Primary School, Bushey
Lodge Farm Primary School, Stevenage
London Colney Primary School, London Colney
Long Marston CE Primary School, Long Marston
Longlands Primary School and Nursery, Broxbourne
Longmeadow Primary School, Stevenage
Lordship Farm Primary School, Letchworth Garden City
Malvern Way Infant School, Croxley Green
Mandeville Primary School, St Albans
Mandeville Primary School, Sawbridgeworth
Manland Primary School, Harpenden
Manor Fields Primary School, Bishop's Stortford
Maple Cross JMI School, Maple Cross
Maple Grove Primary School, Hemel Hempstead
Maple Primary School, St. Albans
Margaret Wix Primary School, St. Albans
Markyate Village School, Markyate
Martins Wood Primary School, Stevenage
Mary Exton Primary School, Hitchin
Merry Hill Infant School, Bushey
Meryfield Primary School, Borehamwood
Micklem Primary School, Hemel Hempstead
Mill Mead Primary School, Hertford
Millbrook School, Cheshunt
Millfield First School, Buntingford
Monksmead School, Borehamwood
Morgans Primary School, Hertford
Moss Bury Primary School, Stevenage
Mount Pleasant Lane Primary School, Bricket Wood
Nascot Wood Infant School, Watford
Nascot Wood Junior School, Watford
Nash Mills CE Primary School, Hemel Hempstead
Newberries Primary School, Radlett
Northaw CE Primary School, Northaw
Northfields Infant School, Letchworth Garden City
Northgate Primary School, Bishop's Stortford
Norton St Nicholas CE Primary School, Letchworth Garden City
Oak View Primary School, Hatfield
Oaklands Primary School, Letchworth
Oakmere Primary School, Potters Bar
Oakwood Primary School, St. Albans
Offley Endowed Primary School, Offley
The Orchard Primary School, Watford
Oughton Primary School, Hitchin Oughton
Our Lady RC Primary School, Hitchin
Our Lady RC Primary School, Welwyn Garden City
Oxhey Wood Primary School, South Oxhey
Panshanger Primary School, Welwyn Garden City
Park Street CE Primary School, Park Street
Parkgate Infant School, Watford
Parkgate Junior School, Watford
Parkside Community Primary School, Borehamwood
Peartree Primary School, Welwyn Garden City
Peartree Spring Primary School, Stevenage
Pirton School, Pirton
Pixies Hill Primary School, Hemel Hempstead
Pixmore Junior School, Letchworth
Ponsbourne St Mary's CE Primary School, Newgate Street
Pope Paul RC Primary School, Potters Bar
Potten End CE Primary School, Potten End
Prae Wood Primary School, St Albans
Preston Primary School, Preston
Priors Wood Primary School, Ware
Puller Memorial CE Primary School, Ware
Purwell Primary School, Hitchin
Redbourn Primary School, Redbourn
The Reddings Primary School, Hemel Hempstead
Reed First School, Reed
Reedings Junior School, Sawbridgeworth
Richard Whittington Primary School, Bishop's Stortford
Rickmansworth Park JMI School, Rickmansworth
Roebuck Academy, Stevenage
Roger De Clare First CE School, Puckeridge
Roman Way Academy, Royston
Roselands Primary School, Hoddesdon
Round Diamond Primary School, Stevenage
Roundwood Primary School, Harpenden
The Russell School, Chorleywood
The Ryde School, Hatfield
Sacred Heart RC Primary School, Ware
Sacred Heart RC Primary School, Bushey
Saffron Green Primary School, Borehamwood
St Albert the Great RC Primary School, Hemel Hempstead
St Adrian RC Primary School, St Albans
St Alban & St Stephen RC Primary School, St Albans
St Andrew's CE Primary School, Much Hadham
St Andrew's CE Primary School, Hitchin
St Andrew's CE Primary School, Stanstead Abbotts
St Anthony's RC Primary School, Watford
St Augustine's RC Primary School, Hoddesdon
St Bartholomew's CE Primary School, Wigginton
St Bernadette RC Primary School, London Colney
St Catherine of Siena RC Primary School, Garston
St Catherine's CE Primary School, Ware
St Catherine's Hoddesdon CE Primary School, Hoddesdon
St Cross RC Primary School, Hoddesdon
St Cuthbert Mayne RC Junior School, Hemel Hempstead
St Dominic RC Primary School, Harpenden
St Giles' CE Primary School, South Mimms
St Helen's CE Primary School, Wheathampstead
St Ippolyts CE Primary School, Hitchin
St John Fisher RC Primary School, St Albans
St John RC Primary School, Baldock
St John RC Primary School, Mill End
St John the Baptist CE Primary School, Great Amwell
St John's CE Infant and Nursery School, Radlett
St John's CE Primary School, Digswell
St John's CE Primary School, Lemsford
St Joseph RC Primary School, South Oxhey
St Joseph's RC Primary School, Bishop's Stortford
St Joseph's RC Primary School, Hertford
St Joseph's RC Primary School, Waltham Cross
St Margaret Clitherow RC Primary School, Stevenage
St Mary RC Primary School, Royston
St Mary's CE Primary School, North Mymms
St Mary's CE Primary School, Northchurch
St Mary's CE Primary School, Rickmansworth
St Mary's Infants' School, Baldock
St Mary's Junior Mixed School, Baldock
St Mary's RC School, Bishop's Stortford
St Mary's CE Junior School, Ware
St Meryl School, Carpenders Park
St Michael's CE Primary School, Bishop's Stortford
St Michael's CE Primary School, St Albans
St Michael's Woolmer Green CE Primary School, Woolmer Green
St Nicholas CE Primary School and Nursery, Stevenage
St Nicholas CE Primary School, Harpenden
St Nicholas Elstree CE Primary School, Elstree
St Paul's CE Primary School, Hunton Bridge
St Paul's CE Primary School, Chipperfield
St Paul's RC Primary School, Cheshunt
St Paul's Walden Primary School, Whitwell
St Peter's CE Primary School, Mill End
St Peter's School, St Albans
St Philip Howard RC Primary School, Hatfield
St Rose's RC Infants School, Boxmoor
St Teresa RC Primary School, Borehamwood
St Thomas More RC Primary School, Letchworth
St Thomas More RC Primary School, Berkhamsted
St Thomas of Canterbury RC Primary School, Puckeridge
St Vincent de Paul RC Primary School, Stevenage
Samuel Lucas JMI School, Hitchin
Samuel Ryder Academy, St Albans
Sandon JMI School, Sandon
Sandridge School, Sandridge
Sarratt CE Primary School, Sarratt, 
Sauncey Wood Primary School, Harpenden
Shenley Primary School, Shenley
Shephalbury Park Primary School, Stevenage
Shepherd Primary School, Rickmansworth
Sheredes Primary School, Hoddesdon
Simon Balle All-through School, Hertford
Skyswood Primary School, St Albans
South Hill Primary School, Hemel Hempstead
Spellbrook CE Primary School, Spellbrook
Springmead Primary School, Welwyn Garden City
Stapleford Primary School, Stapleford
Stonehill School, Letchworth
Strathmore Infant School, Hitchin
Studlands Rise First School, Royston
Summercroft Primary School, Bishop's Stortford
Summerswood Primary School, Borehamwood
Swallow Dell Primary School, Welwyn Garden City
Swing Gate Infant School, Berkhamsted
Tanners Wood JMI School, Abbots Langley
Tannery Drift School, Royston
Templewood Primary School, Welwyn Garden City
Tewin Cowper CE Primary School, Tewin
Therfield First School, Therfield
The Thomas Coram CE School, Berkhamsted
Thorley Hill Primary School, Bishop's Stortford
Thorn Grove Primary School, Bishop's Stortford
Thundridge CE Primary School, Thundridge
Tonwell St Mary's CE Primary School, Tonwell
Trotts Hill Primary School, Stevenage
Tudor Primary School, Hemel Hempstead
Two Waters Primary School, Apsley
Victoria CE Infant School, Berkhamsted
Walkern Primary School, Walkern
Warren Dell Primary School, South Oxhey
Watchlytes Primary School, Welwyn Garden City
Waterside Academy, Welwyn Garden City
Watford Field School, Watford
Watford St John's CE Primary School, Watford
Watton-at-Stone Primary School, Watton-at-Stone
Welwyn St Mary's CE Primary School, Welwyn
Westfield Community Primary School, Hoddesdon
Westfield Primary School, Berkhamsted
Weston Primary School, Weston
Wheatcroft Primary School, Hertford
Wheatfields Infants' School, St Albans
Wheatfields Junior Mixed School, St Albans
Whitehill Junior School, Hitchin
Widford School, Widford
Wilbury Junior School, Letchworth Garden City
William Ransom Primary School, Hitchin
Wilshere-Dacre Junior Academy, Hitchin
Windermere Primary School, St Albans
Windhill21, Bishop's Stortford
Wood End School, Harpenden
Woodhall Primary School, South Oxhey
Woodlands Primary School, Borehamwood
Woodside Primary School, Goffs Oak
Woolenwick Infant School, Stevenage
Woolenwick Junior School, Stevenage
Wormley CofE Primary School, Wormley
Wymondley JMI School, Little Wymondley
The Wroxham School, Potters Bar
Yavneh Primary School, Borehamwood
Yewtree Primary School, Hemel Hempstead
Yorke Mead Primary School, Croxley Green

Middle schools
Edwinstree CofE Middle School, Buntingford
Ralph Sadleir School, Puckeridge

Secondary schools

Adeyfield Academy, Hemel Hempstead
Ashlyns School, Berkhamsted
The Astley Cooper School, Hemel Hempstead
Avanti Grange Secondary School, Bishops Stortford
Barclay Academy, Stevenage
Barnwell School, Stevenage
Beaumont School, St Albans
Birchwood High School, Bishop's Stortford
Bishop's Hatfield Girls' School, Hatfield
The Bishop's Stortford High School, Bishop's Stortford
The Broxbourne School, Broxbourne
Bushey Meads School, Bushey
Chancellor's School, Brookmans Park
Chauncy School, Ware
Croxley Danes School, Rickmansworth
Dame Alice Owen's School, Potters Bar
Elstree Screen Arts Academy, Borehamwood
Fearnhill School, Letchworth
Freman College, Buntingford
Future Academies Watford, Garston
Goffs Academy, Cheshunt
Goffs-Churchgate Academy, Cheshunt
The Grange Academy, Bushey
Haileybury Turnford, Turnford
The Hemel Hempstead School, Hemel Hempstead
The Hertfordshire and Essex High School, Bishop's Stortford
Hertswood Academy, Borehamwood
The Highfield School, Letchworth
Hitchin Boys' School, Hitchin
Hitchin Girls' School, Hitchin
Hockerill Anglo-European College, Bishop's Stortford
John F Kennedy Catholic School, Hemel Hempstead
The John Henry Newman School, Stevenage
The John Warner School, Hoddesdon
Katherine Warington School, Harpenden
King James Academy Royston, Royston
Kings Langley School, Kings Langley
The Knights Templar School, Baldock
Laureate Academy, Hemel Hempstead
The Leventhorpe School, Sawbridgeworth
Longdean School, Hemel Hempstead
Loreto College, St Albans
The Marlborough Science Academy, St Albans
Marriotts School, Stevenage
Monk's Walk School, Welwyn Garden City
Mount Grace School, Potters Bar
Nicholas Breakspear School, St Albans
The Nobel School, Stevenage
Onslow St Audrey's School, Hatfield
Parmiter's School, Garston
Presdales School, Ware
The Priory School, Hitchin
Queens' School, Bushey
The Reach Free School, Rickmansworth
Richard Hale School, Hertford
Rickmansworth School, Croxley Green
Ridgeway Academy, Welwyn Garden City
Robert Barclay Academy, Hoddesdon
Roundwood Park School, Harpenden
St Albans Girls' School, St Albans
St Clement Danes School, Chorleywood
St George's School, Harpenden
St Joan of Arc Catholic School, Rickmansworth
St Mary's Catholic School, Bishop's Stortford
St Mary's Church of England High School, Cheshunt
St Michael's Catholic High School, Watford
Samuel Ryder Academy, St Albans
Sandringham School, St Albans
The Sele School, Hertford
Simon Balle All-through School, Hertford
Sir John Lawes School, Harpenden
Stanborough School, Welwyn Garden City
The Thomas Alleyne Academy, Stevenage
Townsend Church of England School, St Albans
Tring School, Tring
Verulam School, St Albans
Watford Grammar School for Boys, Watford 
Watford Grammar School for Girls, Watford
The Watford UTC, Watford
Westfield Academy, Watford
Yavneh College, Borehamwood

Special and alternative schools

Amwell View School, Stanstead Abbott
Batchwood School, St Albans
Brandles School, Baldock
Breakspeare School, Abbots Langley
Chessbrook Education Support Centre, Watford
The Collett School, Hemel Hempstead
Colnbrook School, Watford
Dacorum Education Support Centre, Hemel Hempstead
Falconer School, Bushey
Garston Manor School, Garston
Greenside School, Stevenage
Hailey Hall School, Hertford
Haywood Grove School, Hemel Hempstead
Heathlands School, St Albans
Knightsfield School, Knightsfield
Lakeside School, Welwyn Garden City
Larwood School, Stevenage
Links Academy, St Albans
Links Hatfield Academy, Hatfield
Lonsdale School, Stevenage
Meadow Wood School, Bushey
Middleton School, Ware
North Herts Education Support Centre, Letchworth
Pinewood School, Ware
Rivers Education Support Centre, Hoddesdon
Roman Fields Academy, Hemel Hempstead
St Luke's School, Redbourn
Southfield School, Hatfield
Stevenage Education Support Centre, Stevenage
The Valley School, Stevenage
Watling View School, St Albans
Woodfield School, Leverstock Green
Woolgrove School, Letchworth

Further education
Hertford Regional College
North Hertfordshire College
Oaklands College
West Herts College

Independent schools

Primary and preparatory schools

Aldwickbury School, Harpenden
Beechwood Park School, Markyate
Bhaktivedanta Manor School, Aldenham
Charlotte House Preparatory School, Rickmansworth
Duncombe School, Hertford
Edge Grove School, Aldenham
Heath Mount School, Watton-at-Stone
Kingshott School, Hitchin
Lochinver House School, Potters Bar
Lockers Park School, Hemel Hempstead
Longwood School, Bushey
Manor Lodge School, Shenley
Merchant Taylors' Prep School, Rickmansworth
Radlett Preparatory School, Radlett
St Hilda's School, Bushey
St Hilda's School, Harpenden
St Joseph's In The Park, Hertford
Stormont School, Potters Bar
Westbrook Hay School, Hemel Hempstead
York House School, Croxley Green

Senior and all-through schools

Abbot's Hill School, Hemel Hempstead
Aldenham School, Elstree
Berkhamsted School, Berkhamsted
Bishop's Stortford College, Bishop's Stortford
Haberdashers' Boys' School, Elstree
Haberdashers' Girls' School, Elstree
Haileybury and Imperial Service College, Hertford Heath
Immanuel College, Bushey Heath
The Kings School, Harpenden
Merchant Taylors' School, Northwood
Purcell School for Young Musicians, Bushey
Queenswood School, Hatfield
The Royal Masonic School for Girls, Rickmansworth
St Albans High School for Girls, St Albans
St Albans School, St Albans
St Christopher School, Letchworth
St Columba's College, St Albans
St Edmund's College, Ware
St Francis College, Letchworth Garden City
St Margaret's School, Bushey
Sherrardswood School, Welwyn
Stanborough School, Watford
Tring Park School for the Performing Arts, Tring

Special and alternative schools
Egerton Rothesay School, Berkhamsted
Elysium Healthcare Potters Bar Clinic School, Potters Bar
Radlett Lodge School, Radlett
Redbourn Park Independent School, Hemel Hempstead
Rhodes Wood Hospital School, Brookmans Park
St Elizabeth's School, Much Hadham
White Trees Independent School, Bishops Stortford

Further education

Benslow Music Trust
St Albans Tutors Independent Sixth Form College

Hertfordshire
Schools in Hertfordshire